A Turf Conspiracy is a 1918 British silent sports crime film directed by Frank Wilson and starring Violet Hopson, Gerald Ames and Joan Legge. It is an adaptation of the 1916 novel of the same name by Nat Gould.

Cast
 Violet Hopson as Madge Iman 
 Gerald Ames as Gordon Chorley 
 Joan Legge as Olga Bell 
 Cameron Carr as Superintendent Ladson  
 Arthur Walcott as Jack Rook  
 Wyndham Guise as Tilston 
 Tom Coventry as Abe Wrench  
 Frank Wilson as Dick Bell 
 W.R. Harrison as Detective Thawson

References

Bibliography
 Palmer, Scott. British Film Actors' Credits, 1895-1987. McFarland, 1988.

External links

1918 films
1910s sports drama films
British sports drama films
British horse racing films
British silent feature films
Films directed by Frank Wilson
Films set in England
Films based on British novels
British black-and-white films
1918 drama films
1910s English-language films
1910s British films
Silent sports drama films